Eric Andre Guliford (born October 25, 1969) was an American football wide receiver who played five seasons in the National Football League and four seasons in the Canadian Football League. He was selected by the Carolina Panthers in the 1995 NFL Expansion Draft.

1993
In 1993, as a rookie free agent who made the Minnesota Vikings roster, he entered a game vs the Green Bay Packers with 14 seconds left and the Vikings trailing by 2 from midfield and managed to get wide open down the right sideline where Jim McMahon found him all alone for a 45 yard pass that he caught, going out of bounds at the 5 yard line to set up a game winning field goal by Fuad Reveiz with six seconds left.

External links
Just Sports Stats

References

1969 births
Living people
Sportspeople from Kansas City, Kansas
Players of American football from Kansas
American football return specialists
American football wide receivers
Arizona State Sun Devils football players
Minnesota Vikings players
Carolina Panthers players
New Orleans Saints players
Winnipeg Blue Bombers players
Saskatchewan Roughriders players
Las Vegas Outlaws (XFL) players